Cast Away is the second album by Austrian symphonic power metal band Visions of Atlantis, released in 2004.

Reception 

Metal Hammer Germany wrote that the album was arranged rather simple and less spectacular than contemporary releases by Nightwish or Within Temptation. Some refrains and intros of Cast Away were even criticised for being almost kitsch. The reviewer was however positive about singer Nicole Bogner's evolution since the previous album.

According to AllMusic reviewer, the album was an indecisive mix of Nightwish and Evanescence. He wrote that both Nicole Bogner's operatic singing and Mario Plank's "pop-oriented" performance made the band lose its musical identity but also opened it for a wider audience.

The Sonic Seducer delivered a positive review, marking an increased quality of performance since the band's debut album. The reviewer lauded the symphonic sound arrangements and Bogner's soprano voice.

Track listing

Credits 
Alex Krull (narrator)
UE Nastasi (mastering)
Eric Philippe (artwork)
Eric Philippe (cover design)
Eric Philippe (logo)
Toni Härkönen (photography)

References 

2004 albums
Visions of Atlantis albums
Napalm Records albums